KBDS (103.9 FM) is a radio station licensed to serve Taft, California, United States. It is owned by Farmworker Educational Radio (through licensee Chavez Radio Group), which itself is owned by the Cesar Chavez Foundation. Studios are located in southwest Bakersfield, and its transmitter is located in Taft.

KBDS currently airs a CHR format with a bilingual music presentation, carrying the Forge network of radio stations.

History
This station was granted its original construction permit from the Federal Communications Commission on January 18, 1985. The new station was assigned the call letters KTLM by the FCC on December 3, 1985. During that time, the station featured a "Big Band" format, playing Swing Era music from the 1930s and 1940s. In March 1988, Louise E. Mann's Mann Broadcasting Company reached an agreement to transfer the permit for this station to The Great Southwest Broadcasting Company.  The deal was approved by the FCC on April 27, 1988, and the transaction was consummated on September 13, 1988.

KTLM received its license to cover from the FCC on August 22, 1989. However, in July 1989 Bakersfield Radio Partners L.P. reached an agreement to acquire this station's permit and license.  The deal was approved by the FCC on November 1, 1989, and the transaction was consummated on December 19, 1989. The new owners had the FCC change the station's callsign to KMYX-FM on January 8, 1990. By that point, the station was broadcasting a "soft rock" format featuring adult contemporary hits of the 1970s and 1980s.

In July 1993, Bakersfield Radio Partners reached an agreement to sell this station to Adelman Communications, Inc.  The deal was approved by the FCC on September 2, 1993, and the transaction was consummated on October 1, 1993. The format switched once again to country, with the moniker "Thunder Country".

In June 1994, Adelman Communications, Inc., reached an agreement to sell this station to Radio Campesina Bakersfield, Inc. The deal was approved by the FCC on July 13, 1994, and the transaction was consummated on August 4, 1994.  The station was assigned the KBDS call letters by the FCC on March 2, 2000. Radio Campesina Bakersfield would later be acquired by Farmworker Educational Radio.

Prior to its flip to rhythmic top 40 in November 2004, KBDS' previous format was Regional Mexican. During its four-year run "Play 103.9" did well, despite competition from rhythmic rival KISV ("Hot 94.1"), who they decided to take on after KKXX-FM flipped formats three months earlier in August 2004. Indeed, when KBDS went silent in November 2008, they were experiencing their highest 12+ Arbitron ratings to date.

On February 5, 2016, KBDS returned to the air with a rhythmic contemporary format, branded as "103.9 The Beat". During the time it was on and off the air, it had simulcasted sister station KMYX-FM in order to keep the license active.

Out of all the stations owned by Farmworker Educational, KBDS is one of only two stations not airing its Regional Mexican network, the other one is KBHH in nearby Fresno. KBHH is branded as "Forge", which in turn would be introduced in Bakersfield on January 16, 2020, when KBDS rebranded as "Forge 103.9". With the rebranding, the station also shifted to a Latin-leaning CHR format. Forge is the secondary network offered by Farmworker Educational Radio.

Competition
As a CHR station, KBDS competes heavily with mainstream outlets KLLY and KKXX-FM. It also received competition from rhythmic rival KQKZ until September 2020, when that station shifted to classic hits.

Controversy
On June 21, 2005, KBDS was sued by contest winner Shannon Castillo, claiming she was misled by the station's promotions to believe she had won a new Hummer H2. In fact, she and another winner were each presented with a remote-control toy model of an H2. The lawsuit seeking $60,000, the approximate cost of a real Hummer H2, further claims that KBDS ran a week's worth of promos mocking her as a victim of the station's April Fool's Day joke (even though the contest itself was a week long and started in March).

Periods of silence
On November 14, 2008, citing poor advertising sales and the state of the economy, KBDS let go its entire programming staff and went off the air. The station formally applied to remain off the air for up to 180 days due to being "unable to operate profitably in the current economic climate". The FCC accepted the filing on December 11, 2008, but dismissed the request on November 16, 2009.  The station had briefly resumed broadcasting in November 2009 to avoid the FCC rules that allows for automatic forfeiture of a broadcast license when a station is silent for more than one year.  However, they fell silent again on November 17, 2009, and applied for new authority to remain silent, again citing financial reasons, on December 31, 2009. The FCC granted this authority on March 10, 2010, with a scheduled expiration of September 7, 2010.

References

External links

Radio stations established in 1989
BDS
Contemporary hit radio stations in the United States
BDS